Malleret is a commune in the Creuse department in the Nouvelle-Aquitaine region in central France.

Geography
The commune lies within the natural park of the Millevaches (1000 lakes, not cows).

Population

Sights
 The church of St. John, dating from the thirteenth century.
 The feudal château at Segourzat.
 A sixteenth-century stone cross.
 Vestiges of a château at Galmaud.

See also
Communes of the Creuse department

References

Communes of Creuse